The 2018 Úrvalsdeild karla, also known as Pepsi-deild karla for sponsorship reasons, was the 107th season of top-flight Icelandic football. Twelve teams contested the league, including the defending champions Valur, who won their 21st league title in 2017.

The season began on 27 April 2018 and concluded on 29 September 2018.

Teams

The 2018 Úrvalsdeild was contested by twelve teams, ten of which played in the division the previous year and two teams promoted from 1. deild karla. The bottom two teams from the previous season, Víkingur Ó. and ÍA, were relegated to the 2018 1. deild karla and were replaced by Fylkir and Keflavík, champions and runners-up of the 2017 1. deild karla respectively.

Club information

Source:

Personnel and kits

Managerial changes

League table

Positions by round

Results
Each team will play home and away once against every other team for a total of 22 games each.

Top goalscorers

References

External links
  

Úrvalsdeild karla (football) seasons
1
Iceland
Iceland